Torre de Obato is a hamlet located in the municipality of Graus, in Huesca province, Aragon, Spain. As of 2020, it has a population of 18.

Geography 
Torre de Obato is located 92km east of Huesca.

References

Populated places in the Province of Huesca